The 2019 Ping An Chinese Football Association Super League was the 16th season since the establishment of the Chinese Super League. The league title sponsor was Ping An Insurance. The season began on 1 March and ended on 1 December. Shanghai SIPG were the defending champions.

The policy regarding foreign players and U-23 domestic players was modified for this season. The same as the previous two seasons, at least one domestic player who is under the age of 23 (born on or after 1 January 1996) must be in the starting eleven. However, the total number of foreign players appearing in a match is no longer related to the total number of U-23 domestic players. A club can register four foreign players at most in the same time and use three foreign players at most in a match. On the other hand, at least three U-23 domestic players must be used in a match. In addition, if there are U-23 players who have been called up by the national teams at all levels, the number of U-23 domestic players fielded will be reduced accordingly. The policy was modified again during the season. From Round 16 and beyond, maximum of three foreign players can be used at the same time in one match and there must be at least one U-23 domestic player playing in one match. In addition, if there are U-23 players who have been called up by the national teams at all levels, the team is not required to field any U-23 players.

Club changes 
Clubs promoted from 2018 China League One
 Wuhan Zall
 Shenzhen F.C.

Clubs relegated to 2019 China League One
 Changchun Yatai
 Guizhou Hengfeng

Name changes 
 Tianjin Quanjian F.C. changed their name to Tianjin Tianhai F.C. in January 2019.

Clubs

Stadiums and Locations

Clubs Locations

Managerial changes

Foreign players

The policy of foreign players remained unchanged. Clubs can register a total of six foreign players over the course of the season, but the number of foreign players allowed on each CSL team at any given time is limited to four. A maximum of three foreign players can be fielded in each match. In addition, each club can register a Hong Kong, Macau, or Taiwan player of Chinese descent (excluding goalkeepers), provided that he registered as a professional footballer in one of those three association for the first time, as a native player.
Players name in bold indicates the player is registered during the mid-season transfer window.

 For Hong Kong, Macau, or Taiwanese players, if they are non-naturalized and were registered as professional footballers in Hong Kong's, Macau's, or Chinese Taipei's football association for the first time, they are recognized as native players. Otherwise they are recognized as foreign players.

League table
<onlyinclude><noinclude>

Results

Positions by round

Results by match played

Goalscorers

Top scorers

Source:

Top assists

Source:

Hat-tricks

Awards

Monthly awards

Annual awards 

The awards of 2019 Chinese Super League were announced on 7 December 2019.

League attendance

References

External links
Current CSL table, and recent results/fixtures at Soccerway

Chinese Super League seasons
1
China